Heinz "Esau" Ewald (1 September 1922 – 14 March 2002) was a Luftwaffe fighter ace and recipient of the Knight's Cross of the Iron Cross during World War II. The Knight's Cross of the Iron Cross was awarded to recognise extreme battlefield bravery or successful military leadership.

Heinz Ewald was credited with 84 victories in 395 combat missions.

Career
On 1 December 1941 Ewald volunteered for military service. After his pilot training, which included flight training with the Fliegerausbildungsregiment 23 in Kaufbeuren, he was posted, in the fall of 1943, to 6. Staffel (6th squadron) of Jagdgeschwader 52 (JG 52—52nd Fighter Wing) on the Eastern Front and was soon one of the best young pilots of his group. He frequently flew as wingman to Gerhard Barkhorn. On his fourth sortie, and on his first enemy encounter, he shot down his first opponent on 11 December 1943. He was awarded the Iron Cross 2nd Class, on 8 January 1944; the Iron Cross 1st Class on 7 March. He was promoted to Leutnant (second lieutenant) on 1 May, and he received the Honor Goblet of the Luftwaffe on 25 May.

On 17 December 1943, Ewald made a forced landing in his Messerschmitt Bf 109 G-6. On 21 March 1944, he was shot down by anti-aircraft artillery in his Bf 109 G-6. On 24 June, he was again shot down, this time in his Bf 109 G-6 (Werknummer 163568—factory number) during combat with Consolidated B-24 Liberator bombers southeast of Malu Roșu, Ploiești and wounded. Prior to being shot down, Esau claimed a B-24 bomber. He made two attacks on the bomber. The first attack, which was made in a head on attack, damaged the bomber and separated it from its combat box. The second attack, which flown from a stern direction, was observed to have shot down the B-24 bomber with its left wing on fire. Flying a third attack on the bomber formation, Ewald was hit by the defensive fire of another bomber. His engine caught fire and he was forced to bail out. Fearing to come to get shot in his parachute by an escorting fighter,  he let himself fall to approximately  before deploying his parachute.

In October, he returned to the front in Hungary, where he received the German Cross in Gold on 30 November. On 15 February 1945, Eawald succeeded Oberleutnant Helmut Lipfert as Staffelkapitän (squadron leader of 6. Staffel of JG 52. On 1 March, the Staffel was redesignated and became the 7. Staffel. That day, he was shot down in his Bf 109 G-10/U4 (Werknummer 610964) by German anti-aircraft artillery near the airfield at Vesprém. On 3 April, he made a strafing attack on Russian positions and came under attack of 12 North American P-51 Mustang resulting in a forced landing  near the front line.

II. Gruppe moved to an airfield at Brünn, present-day Brno in the Czech Republic, on 14 April. There, Ewald claimed his last four aerial victories. That day, he shot down two Ilyushin Il-2 ground-attack aircraft and a Yakovlev Yak-9 fighter on 15 and 16 April, taking his total to 84. Four days later on 20 April, he was awarded the Knight's Cross of the Iron Cross.

Ewald was held as a Prisoner of War at Fürstenfeldbruck Lager from 8 May until 22 June 1945.

Summary of career

Aerial victory claims
According to US historian David T. Zabecki, Ewald was credited with 84 aerial victories. Spick also lists Ewald with 84 aerial victories claimed in 396 combat missions. Mathews and Foreman, authors of Luftwaffe Aces — Biographies and Victory Claims, researched the German Federal Archives and found records for 82 aerial victory claims, including one North American P-51 Mustang, plus 16 further unconfirmed claims. All of his confirmed victories were claimed on the Eastern Front.

Victory claims were logged to a map-reference (PQ = Planquadrat), for example "PQ 34 Ost 66562". These sectors were then subdivided into 36 smaller units to give a location area 3 × 4 km in size.

Awards
 Iron Cross (1939)
 2nd Class (8 January 1944)
 1st Class (7 March 1944)
 Front Flying Clasp of the Luftwaffe in Gold (22 March 1944)
 Honor Goblet of the Luftwaffe on 19 June 1944 as Unteroffizier and pilot
 Wound Badge in Black (1 August 1944)
 German Cross in Gold on 30 November 1944 as Leutnant in the II./Jagdgeschwader 52
 Knight's Cross of the Iron Cross on 20 April 1945 as Leutnant and pilot in the 5./Jagdgeschwader 52

Notes

References

Citations

Bibliography

 
 
 
 
 
 
 
 
 
 
 
 
 
 
 
 

1922 births
2002 deaths
People from Sopot
Recipients of the Knight's Cross of the Iron Cross
Recipients of the Gold German Cross
German World War II pilots
Luftwaffe pilots
People from the Free City of Danzig
Naturalized citizens of Germany